Ma Duanlin (1245–1322) was a Chinese historical writer and encyclopaedist. In 1317, during the Yuan Dynasty, he published the comprehensive Chinese encyclopedia Wenxian Tongkao in 348 volumes.

He was born to the family of Southern Song Minister of the East Ma Tingluan, who had an extensive collection of historical documents. From 1273, Ma Duanlin started the compilation of the Wenxian Tongkao using his father's collection and advice. After the death of his father, Ma Duanlin was called to serve the Yuan dynasty and later played an important role in reviving the educational system of China.

Ma Duanlin describes Champa, Chi Tu, Pan Pan, the Khmer Empire and the Kediri Kingdom.  He describes Jayavarman VII's campaign against Champa for their 1177 invasion, stating "he decided to wreak terrible vengeance on his enemies, which succeeded in doing after eighteen years of patient dissimulation."

References

External links 
Wenxian Tongkao "Comprehensive Studies in Administration" — Chinaknowledge.de.
 Tötösy de Zepetnek, Steven, and Jennifer W. Jay, East Asian Cultural and Historical Perspectives: Histories and Society--culture and Literatures. University of Alberta Research Institute for Comparative Literature and Cross-Cultural Studies, 1997. ,  Всего страниц: 383 с. 66
 Joseph Peter McDermott State and Court Ritual in China стр. 257

Further reading 
 Jay, Jennifer W. Ma Duanlin in A Global Encyclopedia of Historical Writing ed. by Daniel R. Woolf
 Dong, Enlin, et al. (2002). Historical Literature and Cultural Studies. Wuhan: Hubei Dictionary Press. 
 Xu Guanglie. "Wenxian Tongkao" ("Comprehensive Examination of Literature"). Encyclopedia of China, 1st ed.

Song dynasty historians
Yuan dynasty historians
1245 births
1322 deaths
14th-century Chinese historians
Song dynasty politicians from Jiangxi
Historians from Jiangxi
Politicians from Jingdezhen